The Galana Kulalu Project is a US$5,267,000,000 project by the government of Kenya in partnership with the private sector aimed at providing Food Security. The National Irrigation Authority is the implementing agency. On completion the scheme is set to be the biggest in east and southern Africa and a major milestone for Kenya in attaining food security.

The project has faced some challenges in implementation that have delayed its initial timelines. The Galana project stalled in 2019 after the government terminated the contractor.

Kenya's Perennial Maize Shortage 
Maize is the staple food in Kenya.

The Galana Kulalu project is expected to end the perennial Maize shortage in the country by cultivating 200,000 acres of  the Galana- Kulalu complex to meet 41 per cent of the country's annual maize consumption of 48 million bags. In order to cushion farmers against an over supply of maize that could hurt their earnings, Maize at Galana is set to be grown for one season annually.

Controversy

The Galana Kulalu project has been marred with controversy bordering on misappropriation of funds.

References 

Orphaned articles from July 2021
Government of Kenya
Agriculture in Kenya